Duberty Aráoz, also spelled Duberto Aráoz (born 21 December 1920, date of death unknown) was a Bolivian football midfielder who played for Bolivia in the 1950 FIFA World Cup. He also played for Club Litoral. Aráoz is deceased.

References

External links
FIFA profile

1920 births
Year of death missing
Bolivian footballers
Bolivia international footballers
Association football midfielders
Club Deportivo Litoral (Cochabamba) players
1950 FIFA World Cup players